Mellow Mushroom Pizza Bakers is an American pizza restaurant chain that was established in 1974 in Atlanta, Georgia as a single pizzeria. It operates as a franchise under the banner of Home Grown Industries, Inc. of Georgia, with 170 locations throughout the United States. Its headquarters are in Atlanta.

Details
Mellow Mushroom restaurants specialize in pizza, but they also serve calzones, hoagies, salads, appetizers, such as pretzel bites and a wide beer selection. They often feature a large selection of beer, typically 20-40 beers on draft and 50 or more bottled. Each store is locally owned and operated and decorated differently and sometimes there is a unifying theme to the artwork. Tie-dye and colorful mushrooms are a common theme for locations. Some restaurants occasionally feature live music, trivia competitions, karaoke, or bingo.

History
Mellow Mushroom opened in Atlanta, Georgia in 1974 when two college students from Georgia Tech, later joined by a third from the University of Georgia, founded a business that reflected their eccentric philosophies. The first restaurant was opened on Spring Street in Atlanta. In the late 1980s, the first franchise was opened by an employee, followed by customer-owned franchises, and then to friends of employees and customers. Each franchise is locally owned and operated with its own unique feel.

The first franchise to be located outside of Atlanta was in Athens, Georgia, near the University of Georgia. There are several dozen locations operating in Atlanta and elsewhere in Georgia. Beginning in 2000, the franchise expanded outside college markets to urban areas such as Jacksonville, Florida and Denver, Colorado. To date, the chain has over 200 locations across 20 states.

Its Sarasota, FL location is well known for being the site, prior to its opening, of the infamous 1991 arrest of actor Paul Reubens, known for his Pee Wee Herman character, for public masturbation.

Logo
The visual identity of Mellow Mushroom Pizza was defined during their early franchising phase by Atlanta artist Buddy Finethy. Finethy created and refined the chain's mascot, Mel O. Mushroom, as well as the supporting cast of animated characters that identified the chain.

See also
 List of pizza chains of the United States

References

External links
Official website

Companies based in Atlanta
Restaurants in Atlanta
Regional restaurant chains in the United States
1974 establishments in Georgia (U.S. state)
Pizza chains of the United States
Restaurants established in 1974